As of 2022, daylight saving time is used in the following Asian countries:

 : From last Sunday March to last Sunday October; follows EU practice.
 : From Friday before the last Sunday of March to last Sunday October; follows EU practice.
 : From last Sunday March to last Sunday October
  Palestine: From last Saturday March to last Saturday October

By country and regions

People's Republic of China

The People's Republic of China experimented with DST from 1986, but abandoned DST from 1992 onwards. The PRC now uses one time zone (UTC+08:00) for the whole country.

Egypt 

The British first instituted summer time in Egypt in 1940, during the Second World War. The practice was stopped after 1945, but resumed 12 years later, in 1957.

Before the revolution in January 2011, the government was planning to take a decision to abolish summer time in 2011 before President Hosni Mubarak's term expires in September 2011. The transitional government did so on 20 April 2011.

Under the pretext that daylight saving time would save energy, the Egyptian government decided on 7 May 2014 to reinstate summer time with an exception for the holy month of Ramadan. In April the next year, a poll was held on whether to apply summer time or not. Following the results, the government decided on 20 April to temporarily cancel summer time, to make the necessary amendment to the laws and asked the ministers to work on a study to determine the probability of applying DST in coming years or not. The ministry of electricity assured that the achieved electricity savings from applying summer time is not of any tangible effect. Summer time was expected to return in 2016, starting on July 8 (after Ramadan), but on July 5, it was decided to again cancel it.

Hong Kong
Hong Kong used DST beginning in 1941, but abandoned it from 1980 onwards.

India

India and the Indian subcontinent employed DST during the Second World War, from 1942 to 1945. During the Sino-Indian War of 1962 and the Indo-Pakistani Wars of 1965 and 1971, daylight saving time was briefly observed to minimize civilian energy consumption. Currently, India does not observe DST, and uses just one time zone (UTC+5:30) for the entire country.

Indonesia

Currently, Indonesia does not observe DST. However, various DST offsets were observed from 1 January 1924 to 1 January 1964.

Iran

Iran observed DST in 1977–1980, 1991–2005 and 2008-2022 from March 21–22 (1/1 Iranian calendars) to September 21–22 (6/30 Iranian calendars).

Israel

Israel observed DST in 1940–1946, 1948–1957, 1974–1975 and since 1985. Currently, DST is observed from the Friday before the last Sunday of March to the last Sunday of October.

Jordan
Jordan observed DST in 1985–2022 from the last Friday of March to the last Friday of October. On 24 October 2012, Jordan decided to continue observing daylight saving time for an entire year, ending in December 2013. On 5 October 2022, Jordan abolished DST, while changing the country's time zone to what used to be summer time (UTC+03:00), effectively scrapping winter time.

Kazakhstan

Kazakhstan made a decision to stop observing summer time in 2005, citing health complications as well as lowered productivity and a lack of economic benefits.

Kyrgyzstan
Kyrgyzstan voted to stop observing DST in 2005 and make UTC+06:00 as Standard Time (which used to be Kyrgyzstan Summer Time), thus having permanent DST due to the time zone shift.

Malaysia

Malaysia used DST from January 1, 1933, but discontinued on December 31, 1981 to replace DST with Malaysian Standard Time.  Other sources claim that Malaysia ceased DST on January 1, 1936, along with Singapore.

Philippines

, the Philippines does not observe daylight saving time, although it was enforced for short periods during the presidency of Manuel L. Quezon in 1936-1937, Ramon Magsaysay in 1954, Ferdinand Marcos in 1978, and Corazon Aquino in 1990.

DST was primarily intended to alleviate the energy crisis by minimizing the number of hours in which electric lighting was needed, reducing the strain on the national power grid. As power generation and transmission capacities improved, the practice was abandoned.

In April 2006, the Department of Trade and Industry again proposed that DST be re-implemented to help deal with rising oil prices.

In August 2014, President Benigno Aquino III was urged by LPGMA Partylist Representative Arnel Ty to observe DST from November 2014 to January 2015 and March to June 2015 to prepare for the power crisis in the country but the President did not implement the DST.

In March 2022, MMDA was studying the proposed DST amid the heavy vehicular traffic observed in the National Capital Region, however week later this already forwarded to Malacanang and it only entails the change in the work hours of government agencies and not a clock shift for the entire country.

Russia

A decree of the Russian Provisional Government introduced summer time in Russia on 1 July 1917, and clocks moved one hour forward. A decree of the Soviet government led to the abandonment of this system five months later: clocks moved one hour back again on 28 December.

From 1930, Decree time had the effect of imposing year-round time-zone advances in the Soviet Union.

A decision of the Council of Ministers of the USSR reintroduced summer time in the USSR (Moscow Summer Time, for example) on 1 April 1981, and its practice continued into post-Soviet times until 2011. The changeover dates in Russia were the same as for other European countries, but clocks were moved forward or back at 02:00 local time in all zones. Thus in Moscow (local time = UTC+03:00 in winter, UTC+04:00 in summer), summer time commenced at 02:00 UTC on the day before the last Sunday in March, and ended at 03:00 UTC on the day before the last Sunday in October. (Note that "day before the last Sunday" is not the same as "the last Saturday" in a month where the last day is a Saturday.)

On 8 February 2011, Russian President Dmitry Medvedev announced cancellation of biannual clock changes in Russia in favor of a permanent switch to summer time. An hour was added in March 2011 for the last time, and clocks did not move back again. At the same time some of Russia's time zones were consolidated. After this reform many Russian cities had a "standard time" two hours more than would be suggested by their "astronomical time" (because the original standard time was already ahead of astronomical time in many areas).

During his 2012 election campaign, Vladimir Putin proposed re-introducing summer time, as some workers had complained about not seeing any daylight during the winter, since the sun had not risen when they went to work. According to a report in the International Herald Tribune, Russian citizens remembered the winter of 2011-12 as the "darkest winter on record" as a result of the time change. However, Putin later said it would be up to then Prime Minister Medvedev's cabinet to decide how to proceed with a seasonal time shift, and it decided to stay with the 2011 policy.

On 26 October 2014, Russia permanently returned to "winter" time.

South Korea
South Korea observed DST from 1948–51, from 1955–60, and from 1987–88. South Korea does not currently observe DST.

Syria
Syria observed DST in 1986–2022. Since 2012, DST was observed from the last Friday of March to the last Friday of October; however, the days of time switches varied year-to-year between 1986–2011. On 4 October 2022, Syria abolished DST, while changing the country's time zone to what used to be summer time (UTC+03:00), effectively scrapping winter time.

Taiwan

Taiwan implemented DST from 1945–61, revoked DST from 1962–73, reinstated DST from 1974–75, revoked DST from 1976–79 and reinstated it in 1980. Taiwan abandoned DST from 1981 onwards.

Turkey

Turkey is currently observing year-round daylight saving from September 2016. DST was used from 1985–2016.

In 2008, the Turkish Ministry of Energy proposed that Turkey should abolish summer time while at the same time switching to UTC+02:30, originally from 2009 onwards, but when this appeared infeasible, to start in 2011, the plan has not been heard of since.

For the year 2011, Turkey switched to European Summer Time at 3:00 am (03:00) on Monday 28 March, one day later than the rest of Europe, to avoid disrupting the national university entrance examinations held on 27 March.

Once again, for the year 2014, Turkey switched to European Summer Time at 3:00 am (03:00) on Monday 31 March, one day later than the rest of Europe, to avoid disrupting the local elections held on 30 March.

In 2015, Turkey delayed the switch from European Summer Time by 2 weeks, to 4:00 am (04:00) on Sunday 8 November, two weeks later than the rest of Europe, due to the calling of a snap general election on Sunday, 1 November.

In 2016, Turkey scrapped winter time, by switching to New Turkey Time. This means permanent UTC+03:00, which was used during summer time in Turkey. The switch was on 12:00 am (00:00) on Thursday 8 September, in reality stopping switches between summer and winter time.

Asian countries not using DST
These countries or regions do not use daylight saving time, although some have in the past:
 
  (Observed DST in 1981–1995, 1997–2011)
  (Observed DST in 1981–1989, 1990–1992 and 1996–2015)
 
  (Observed DST in 1942–1945 and 2009–10)
 
 
  (Observed DST in 1986–1992)
 
  (Observed DST in 1940–1945, 1957–2010 and 2014)
  (Observed DST in 1942–1945 during the World War II)
  (Observed various DST offsets in 1924–1963)
  (Observed DST in 1977–1980, 1991–2005 and 2008–2022)
  (Observed DST in 1982–2007)
  (Observed DST in 1948–1951)
  (Observed DST in 1985–2022)
  (Observed DST in 1981–1990 and 1992–2004)
 
  (Observed DST in 1981–2005)
 
  (Observed DST in 1933–1981)
 
  (Observed DST in 1983–1989; 1990–1998; 2001–2006 and 2015–2017)
 
 
  (Observed DST in 1973–1984; 1990–1994; 2003–2009; 2012–2014 and 2017–2021)
 
  (Observed DST in 1942–1945, 2002 and 2008–2009)
  (Observed DST in 1936–1937, 1954, 1978 and 1990)
 
  (Observed DST in 1917–1919 and 1921 (some areas), 1981–2010. 2011–2014, used year-round DST. In 2014, Russia discontinued year-round DST and switched back to standard time)
 
  (Observed DST in 1933–1935 by adding 20 minutes to standard time. On January 1, 1936, country changed their time zone to UTC+07:20 which was used till midnight of September 1st, 1941 when it was standardized to UTC+07:30. In 1981, Malaysia decided to standardise the time across its territories to a uniform UTC+08:00, and Singapore elected to follow suit. Singapore moved half an hour forward, on 31 December 1981 at 11:30 pm, creating "Singapore Standard Time" (SST). SST is 8 hours ahead of UTC.
  (Observed DST in 1948–1951, 1955–1960 and 1987–1988)
 
  (Observed DST in 1986–2022)
  (Observed DST in 1945–1962, 1974, 1975 and 1979)
  (Observed DST in 1981–1991)
 
  (observed DST from 1985–2016)
  (Observed DST in 1981–1991)
  (Observed DST in 2008–2013)
  (Observed DST in 1981–1991)

References

Daylight saving time
Time in Asia